Barne Glacier is a steep glacier in Antarctica which descends from the western slopes of Mount Erebus and terminates on the west side of Ross Island, between Cape Barne and Cape Evans where it forms a steep ice cliff. It was discovered by the Discovery Expedition, 1901–04, under Robert Falcon Scott, and named by the British Antarctic Expedition, 1907–09, under Ernest Shackleton, after nearby Cape Barne, which itself is named after Michael Barne of Sotterley, Suffolk who was the second lieutenant during the Discovery Expedition.

See also
 Glaciology

References
 

Glaciers of Ross Island